The Paris Literary Prize was a biennial literary prize for unpublished novellas by new authors from anywhere in the world. It was founded in 2010 by the Paris-based Shakespeare and Company bookstore, and sponsored in collaboration with the de Groot Foundation. The  prize was for authors who had never published a book before, and their submission is a novella, defined as 20,000 to 30,000 words in length. The first winner was announced on 16 June 2011.

After two awards it went into hiatus, saying "We'd love to hold another edition of the prize at some point, but we are unable to fix a date at this time."

Winners and Runners-up
Blue Ribbon = winner 

2011

 Winner:  Rosa Rankin-Gee, The Last Kings of Sark
Adam Biles, Grey Cats
Agustín Maes, Newborn

2013 

 Winner C.E. Smith, Body Electric
Svetlana Lavochkina, Dam Duchess
Tessa Brown, Sorry for Partying

Notes

External links
The Paris Literary Prize, official website.

Awards established in 2010
French literary awards
International literary awards
Literary awards honoring unpublished books or writers
First book awards
Novella awards
2010 establishments in France